Minipsyrassa is a genus of beetles in the family Cerambycidae, containing the following species:

 Minipsyrassa bicolor Martins, 1974
 Minipsyrassa guanabarina Martins & Napp, 1992

References

Elaphidiini